Załuski  is a village in the administrative district of Gmina Błędów in Grójec County, Masovian Voivodeship, in east-central Poland. Its population is 180.

References

Villages in Grójec County